is a Japanese photographer. He has been taking pictures of wildlife in Japan and Russia. He spends 100 to 150 days every year in the Far East of Russia, photographing the endangered species and other wildlife. He has been working with the Russian Academy of Sciences since 1991 and is an honorary member of the Academy's Far East branch of the Institute of Marine Biology.

Works

Awards
 2013 - Gerald Durrell Award for Endangered Species, Wildlife Photographer of the Year for Tiger untrapped

References

 Iony Island photo gallery by Toshiji Fukuda discoverwildlife.com
 FUKUDA, Toshiji Nikon Web Gallery

External links
 

Japanese photographers
Nature photographers
1948 births
Living people